

M

Mary MacPherran / Titania 

Mary MacPherran (portrayed by Jameela Jamil), also known as Titania, is a social media influencer with incredible strength who is obsessed with She-Hulk, ultimately becoming her rival.

 the character has appeared in the Disney+ series She-Hulk: Attorney at Law.

Makkari 

Makkari (portrayed by Lauren Ridloff) is an Eternal who can move at superhuman speeds. She is implied to harbor romantic feelings for Druig.

The character is the first deaf superhero in the MCU. Actress Lauren Ridloff stated that she started running and muscle-building to have "the symmetry of somebody who looks like a sprinter."

 the character has appeared in the film Eternals.

Malekith 

Malekith the Accursed (portrayed by Christopher Eccleston) is the king of the Dark Elves who faces Thor in 2013.

 the character has appeared in the film Thor: The Dark World.

Mantis

Mar-Vell 

Mar-Vell (portrayed by Annette Bening) is a Kree scientist who rejected her species' war with the Skrulls. She fled to Earth in the 1980s and adopted the alias of Dr. Wendy Lawson, a physicist at Project Pegasus. Using the Tesseract, she sought to develop an experimental engine that would have allowed the Skrulls to settle beyond the reach of the Kree Empire. She is killed by Yon-Rogg, though she is able to instruct Carol Danvers to destroy the engine before Yon-Rogg is able to seize the device. The Supreme Intelligence later takes on her appearance while conversing with Danvers.

 the character has appeared in the film Captain Marvel.

Flint Marko / Sandman 

Flint Marko (motion-captured by Jon Watts, voiced by Thomas Haden Church), also known as the Sandman, is a small-time thief from an alternate reality who received an ability to transform into sand.

Church reprises his role from Sam Raimi's Spider-Man 3 (2007) in Spider-Man: No Way Home; footage of when Marko is cured is taken directly from that film.

Phineas Mason 

Phineas Mason (portrayed by Michael Chernus) is a weapons maker and part of a salvage company alongside Adrian Toomes, Herman Schultz, and Jackson Brice. When the salvaging company goes out of business due to the Department of Damage Control, Mason helps Toomes steal leftover technology from the Avengers' battles and build advanced weapons out of the technology, such as Toomes' flight suit and modified versions of Brock Rumlow's vibro-blast emitting gauntlets. While his assistants were defeated by Spider-Man and arrested by the authorities, Mason's fate is left unknown.

 the character has appeared in the film Spider-Man: Homecoming.

Rick Mason 

Rick Mason (portrayed by O-T Fagbenle) is an ally from Natasha Romanoff's S.H.I.E.L.D. past who helps her in 2016 while she is a fugitive.

 the character has appeared in the film Black Widow.

Ebony Maw 

Ebony Maw (voiced and portrayed via motion capture by Tom Vaughan-Lawlor) is an adopted son of Thanos and member of the Black Order who is killed in space after being defeated by Tony Stark and Peter Parker. A past version of Maw from 2014 travels through time with Thanos' forces to stop the Avengers from foiling his plans. However, they are all disintegrated when Stark uses the Infinity Gauntlet.

 the character has appeared in the film Avengers: Infinity War. An alternate version of Maw appeared in Avengers: Endgame. An alternate version of Maw appeared in the Disney+ animated series What If...?

Pietro Maximoff 

Pietro Maximoff (portrayed by Aaron Taylor-Johnson) is Wanda Maximoff's twin brother. They are introduced as Hydra assets, both acquiring superhuman powers after volunteering to be experimented upon by the Mind Stone, with Pietro gaining superhuman speed. Harboring a lifelong hatred for American arms manufacturer Tony Stark, whose bombs killed their parents, they side with Ultron against the Avengers before later switching sides. In the final conflict with Ultron, Pietro dies a hero's death, saving the lives of Clint Barton and a Sokovian boy. In 2023, the witch Agatha Harkness forces Westview resident Ralph Bohner to impersonate Pietro to get close to Wanda within her created alternate reality.

The character's reception has been lukewarm with complaints that the character or his power was not developed enough compared to the comic book version or 20th Century Fox's X-Men film series version.

 the character has appeared in two films: Captain America: The Winter Soldier (mid-credits cameo) and Avengers: Age of Ultron; as well as in flashbacks and recaps in the Disney+ series WandaVision.

Wanda Maximoff / Scarlet Witch

Maximoff family  

Wanda and Pietro Maximoff were born to Iryna and Olek Maximoff (portrayed by Ilana Kohanchi and Daniyar respectively in WandaVision) in war-torn Sokovia, with Pietro stating that he is "twelve minutes older." Iryna and Olek were killed by a Stark Industries bomb, leading the twins down a dark path leading to the creation of Ultron, though they aided the Avengers when Ultron's true plan to destroy Sokovia and the world was revealed. Pietro was killed saving the life of Clint Barton, and Wanda's life continued in tragedy after her romantic partner Vision was killed by Thanos.

In grief, Wanda created a fictional reality based on the sitcoms she watched as a child, featuring a perfect life with her and Vision. In this reality, called the Hex, Wanda gave birth to twins, Billy and Tommy Maximoff (portrayed by Baylen Bielitz and Gavin Borders as young children respectively, and Julian Hilliard and Jett Klyne as slightly older children, in WandaVision). Soon, it is discovered that Billy has magical powers similar to his mother, and Tommy has superhuman speed like his uncle Pietro. Ultimately, Wanda comes to terms with reality and takes down the Hex, saying goodbye to her children. However, she is corrupted by the Darkhold and uses it to try and find a universe where her children actually exist.

One such universe was designated as Earth-838, where real versions of Billy and Tommy (once again portrayed by Julian Hilliard and Jett Klyne) live happily with Wanda as a single mother, though they are terrified of Earth-616's Wanda when she reveals herself as the Scarlet Witch. While the Wanda of Earth-838 maintains her powers, Billy and Tommy don't seem to have supernatural abilities.

, versions of Billy and Tommy Maximoff have appeared in the Disney+ series WandaVision and the film Doctor Strange in the Multiverse of Madness.

M'Baku 

M'Baku (portrayed by Winston Duke) is the leader of the renegade Jabari Tribe, who shun Wakanda's technological society and have a religious reverence for gorillas, such as decorating their armor with white gorilla pelts and worshiping the ape god, Hanuman, as a part of a complex Indo-African religion rather than the Panther god Bast. In Black Panther, M'Baku challenges T'Challa for control of Wakanda. When he is defeated in combat, the latter convinces him to yield. M'Baku returns the favor by looking after the wounded T'Challa following the latter's fight with N'Jadaka and agreeing to look after Ramonda. He initially declines T'Challa's request to help fight N'Jadaka, but ultimately reconsiders and leads the Jabari into battle against him. Following N'Jadaka's death, M'Baku is granted a place on Wakanda's national council.

Later, in Avengers: Infinity War, he and the Jabari join the battle against Thanos' Outriders; M'Baku survives the Blip. In 2023, he joins the final battle against a past version of Thanos. In 2025, following T'Challa's and Ramonda's deaths, and respecting M'Baku's advice during the Talokan—Wakanda War, Shuri allows M'Baku to issue a challenge for the throne of Wakanda, which she forfeits by not showing up to, indicating that M'Baku will become the new King of Wakanda.

 the character has appeared in four films: Black Panther, Avengers: Infinity War, Avengers: Endgame and Black Panther: Wakanda Forever.

Proxima Midnight 

Proxima Midnight (voiced and faced by Carrie Coon, motion-captured by Monique Ganderton) is Thanos' adopted daughter. She joined her father in his quest for the six Infinity Stones, initially attacked the Statesman with her brothers, helping to kill the Asgardians aboard to retrieve the Space Stone. While attempting to claim the Mind Stone, she and Corvus Glaive attack Wanda Maximoff and Vision, but are repelled by Steve Rogers, Sam Wilson, and Natasha Romanoff. During a second attempt at the Mind Stone, Proxima fights Romanoff and Okoye, but is ultimately killed by Maximoff. A past version of Midnight from 2014 travels through time with Thanos' forces to stop the Avengers from foiling his plans. However, they are all disintegrated when Tony Stark uses the Infinity Gauntlet.

 the character has appeared in the film Avengers: Infinity War. An alternate version of Midnight appeared in Avengers: Endgame. An alternate version of Midnight appeared in the Disney+ animated series What If...?

Miek 

Miek (voiced by Stephen Murdoch) is a Sakaaran insectoid warrior. This version of the character is a larva-like creature as opposed to a humanoid roach like in the comic books, and initially uses an exoskeleton equipped with blades in combat. Having been freed from the Grandmaster's prison, Miek fights alongside Thor and Korg and joins the Asgardian people in their journey to Earth after the destruction of Asgard. Along with Korg, he survives Thanos' attack on the Asgardian starship and the Blip. He finds a new home with the Asgardians in New Asgard in Norway. Miek participates in the final battle at the destroyed Avengers Headquarters against Thanos and his army. Sometime later, Miek metamorphoses to a female form, and she organises tourism in New Asgard.

 the character has appeared in three films: Thor: Ragnarok, Avengers: Endgame and Thor: Love and Thunder. An alternate version of Miek appeared in the Disney+ animated series What If...?

Mobius M. Mobius 

Mobius M. Mobius (portrayed by Owen Wilson) is an agent of the Time Variance Authority specialized in the investigation of particularly dangerous "time variant" criminals. He befriends a 2012 variant of Loki.

 the character has appeared in the Disney+ series Loki, as well as the film Ant-Man and the Wasp: Quantumania (post-credits cameo).

Anton Mogart 

Anton Mogart (portrayed by Gaspard Ulliel) is a wealthy antiquities collector living in Egypt and an old acquaintance of Layla El-Faouly. Marc Spector, Steven Grant, and El-Faouly meet with him to find the map to Ammit's tomb. He betrays them when Arthur Harrow arrives and is speared through the chest by Spector.

 the character has appeared in the Disney+ series Moon Knight.

Karl Mordo 

Karl Mordo (portrayed by Chiwetel Ejiofor) is a sorcerer and a former member of the Masters of the Mystic Arts. A close ally to the Ancient One, he assists in recruiting and training their future sorcerers. In this role, he trains Stephen Strange, using the Staff of the Living Tribunal as his weapon. He also helps Strange fight against Kaecilius. The Ancient One notes that Mordo's strength must be balanced by Strange since Mordo is unable to recognize the need for moral flexibility and compromise. In 2016, disillusioned with the teachings of the Ancient One after learning that the latter's immortality has been the result of her drawing on the energy of the Dark Dimension and Strange further breaking nature's laws, he decides to leave his fellow sorcerers. He comes to believe that all magic perverts and disrupts the natural order, thus causing him to set out to stop others from using it. Mordo later visits former Master Jonathan Pangborn and steals the energy that he uses to walk, stating that the world has "too many sorcerers".

In an alternate universe designated as Earth-838, Baron Karl Mordo is the Sorcerer Supreme and a member of the Illuminati, following the betrayal of his universe's Stephen Strange.

 the character has appeared in the film Doctor Strange. The Earth-838 version of Mordo appeared in Doctor Strange in the Multiverse of Madness.

Karli Morgenthau 

Karli Morgenthau (portrayed by Erin Kellyman) is the teenage leader of the anti-nationalist terrorist group the Flag Smashers, who were made Super Soldiers with the help of the Power Broker (Sharon Carter) and use violent tactics such as bombings to achieve open borders for refugees in the Baltic states. She is killed by Carter (to hide Carter's identity as the Power Broker) after she attempts to kill Carter and an oblivious Sam Wilson.

 the character has appeared in the Disney+ series The Falcon and the Winter Soldier.

Matt Murdock / Daredevil

N

Najma 

Najma (portrayed by Nimra Bucha) is Kamran's mother, and the leader of the Clandestines, who want to return to their home dimension at any cost necessary.

 the character has appeared in the Disney+ series Ms. Marvel.

Nakia 

Nakia (portrayed by Lupita Nyong'o) is a former Dora Milaje, a member of the War Dogs, and T'Challa's lover. Having often been sent on missions around the world and witnessing the hardships experienced by many people, she grows in the belief that Wakanda should actively help them. Nakia returns to Wakanda upon hearing that T'Challa's father, T'Chaka, was killed. She stays after T'Challa is crowned king and asks that she accompany him to one of their missions. After N'Jadaka seizes the throne and orders the heart-shaped herbs which grant the power of the Black Panther to be burned, Nakia steals one. Although Ramonda urges Nakia to consume it to challenge N'Jadaka, Nakia plans to offer it to M'Baku so that he can challenge N'Jadaka with his army. M'Baku reveals that his people have recovered T'Challa, so Nakia gives the herb to T'Challa, healing him and restoring his powers as the Black Panther. Nakia then assists in the insurrection against N'Jadaka, dressing as a Dora Milaje soldier at Shuri's insistence. Following N'Jadaka's death, Nakia resumes her relationship with T'Challa and accepts a position running a Wakandan outreach center in California at the location of N'Jobu and N'Jadaka's former apartment. Sometime after, Nakia and T'Challa have a child, also named T'Challa, and decide to have him be raised away from the throne. After Thanos' attack on Wakanda and the ensuing Blip, Nakia leaves Wakanda and raises her child in Haiti.

 the character has appeared in two films: Black Panther and Black Panther: Wakanda Forever.

Namor 

Namor (portrayed by Tenoch Huerta Mejía) is the king of Talokan, whose people refer to him as the feathered serpent god K'uk'ulkan. In 1517, his mother Fen ingested a vibranium-laced herb to gain immunity from smallpox while pregnant with her son. The effects of the herb caused her and the rest of Yucatán's people to develop blue skin and grow gills that restricted their ability to breathe air on the surface, thus forcing them to relocate underwater and establish Talokan as a new civilization. The herb additionally caused her son to undergo a mutation at birth, which gave him pointed ears and winged ankles enabling him to fly, as well as hybrid human physiology that enabled him to breathe oxygen and water simultaneously. Motivated by his hatred of the surface world, and a recent discovery of a vibranium detection device designed by Riri Williams in the ocean that put his nation at risk, he initially attempted to forge a military alliance with the nation of Wakanda to protect Talokan while supplying their people with his army due to its similarly isolationist nature in exchange for the custody of Williams, to which both Queen Ramonda and Princess Shuri decline. However, after a fight between the two nations, Shuri and Namor come to an alliance, and opt to help each other in the future.

 the character has appeared in the film Black Panther: Wakanda Forever.

Namora 

Namora (portrayed by Mabel Cadena) is Namor's cousin and a warrior from Talokan.

 the character has appeared in the film Black Panther: Wakanda Forever.

Nebula

N'Jadaka / Erik "Killmonger" Stevens 

N'Jadaka (portrayed by Michael B. Jordan), also known as Erik Stevens or Killmonger, is a former U.S. Navy SEAL lieutenant and the son of N'Jobu. His father was killed by T'Chaka for helping Ulysses Klaue smuggle vibranium out of Wakanda to arm oppressed peoples around the world and initiate revolutions. N'Jadaka later becomes an acquaintance of Klaue, before betraying and killing him to gain the trust of the Wakandan population. After bringing the dead Klaue, he challenges his cousin T'Challa to a duel over the throne, which N'Jadaka wins. However, T'Challa later returns to take back his throne, with the help of M'Baku, Okoye, and Shuri. T'Challa defeats N'Jadaka in combat and fatally wounds him, although he takes N'Jadaka to see the Wakandan sunset per his wishes. N'Jadaka dies after refusing to be healed, claiming that death is "better than bondage". Impacted by his cousin's death, T'Challa decides to finally open Wakanda up to the rest of the world. Following the deaths of T'Challa and his and Shuri's mother Ramonda, N'Jadaka's spirit meets with Shuri in the ancestral plane after she ingests a synthetic version of the heart-shaped herb, warning her of how close her desire for vengeance upon Namor is bringing her to being like him, with Shuri then assuming a Black Panther suit inspired by N'Jadaka's. The character has been widely praised as one of the MCU's best villains, with Ben Child of The Guardian comparing the character to the Terminator and Darth Vader.

 the character has appeared in two films: Black Panther and Black Panther: Wakanda Forever. An alternate version of Killmonger appeared in the Disney+ animated series What If...?.

N'Jobu 

N'Jobu (portrayed by Sterling K. Brown) is the younger brother of T'Chaka and an agent of the War Dogs. After betraying his own people and aiding Ulysses Klaue with getting vibranium out of Wakanda with the intention of allowing oppressed people to possess its power, N'Jobu is confronted and killed by T'Chaka. His only son N'Jadaka eventually figures this out and plans to avenge his death and finish his work by becoming King.

 the character has appeared in the film Black Panther.

O

Kraglin Obfonteri 

Kraglin Obfonteri (portrayed by Sean Gunn) is a Xandarian and the first mate of Yondu Udonta's faction of the Ravagers. In 2014, following the mutiny of the other Ravagers, Kraglin remains loyal to Yondu and helps rescue the Guardians of the Galaxy from Ego. After Yondu's death, Kraglin acquires a similar cybernetic fin and Yaka arrow. In 2023, he is transported  to Earth to join the Avengers and other heroes in the battle against a past version of Thanos. He later joins the Guardians as an official member.

 the character has appeared in four films: Guardians of the Galaxy, Guardians of the Galaxy Vol. 2, Avengers: Endgame (cameo) and Thor: Love and Thunder, as well as the Disney+ special The Guardians of the Galaxy Holiday Special. An alternate version of Kraglin appeared in the Disney+ animated series What If...? He will return in the upcoming film Guardians of the Galaxy Vol. 3.

Cull Obsidian 

Cull Obsidian (voiced and portrayed via motion capture by Terry Notary) is an adopted son of Thanos equipped with a chain hammer and an arm blade. In 2018, he and Ebony Maw go to Earth to retrieve the Time Stone. They arrive in New York City and find themselves confronted by Stephen Strange, Wong, Tony Stark, and later Peter Parker. In the ensuing fight, Obsidian is tricked by Wong into jumping through a portal into Antartica, severing his hand in the process. He is rescued by Proxima Midnight and Corvus Glaive, and his hand is replaced by a cybernetic replacement. He then partakes in the battle in Wakanda, killing many people and knocking James Rhodes out of the sky. Later, Obsidian attacks Vision and is confronted by Bruce Banner, who defeats him in the Hulkbuster armor by sending him flying into the Wakandan energy shield, incinerating Obsidian on impact. 

An alternate version of Cull Obsidian arrives with an alternate Thanos and his army into the main universe. During the battle, is stepped on and killed by Scott Lang.

 the character has appeared in the film: Avengers: Infinity War. An alternate version of Obsidian appeared in the film Avengers: Endgame. Another alternate version of Obsidian appeared in the Disney+ animated series What If...?

Otto Octavius / Doctor Octopus 

 alternate versions of Otto Octavius / Doctor Octopus, a brilliant scientist with four mechanical tentacles fused to his back, have appeared in the film Spider-Man: No Way Home and the Disney+ animated series Spider-Man: Freshman Year. In No Way Home, Alfred Molina reprises his version of Doctor Octopus, who arrives in the primary MCU reality due to Doctor Strange's malfunctioned spell, from Sam Raimi's Spider-Man 2 (2004).

Odin 

Odin Borson (portrayed by Anthony Hopkins), also known as Odin Allfather, is the ruler of Asgard, son of Bor, biological father of Thor and Hela, adoptive father of Loki, and husband of Frigga. He is based on Odin in Norse mythology. In 2013, he is removed from power by Loki and is placed under a spell to make him forget his past life before being put into a retirement home in New York City. He manages to break free of Loki's spell before heading to Norway instead of returning to Asgard, wishing to not be disturbed. When he is found by his sons, Odin warns them that his time has come and that Hela will be freed after his death. He bids them both farewell and soon disappears.

 the character has appeared in four films: Thor, Thor: The Dark World, Thor: Ragnarok, and Thor: Love and Thunder (archival footage); as well as the Disney+ series Loki (archival footage). An alternate version of Odin appeared in the Disney+ animated series What If...?

Okoye 

Okoye (portrayed by Danai Gurira) is a Wakandan warrior and the former general of the Dora Milaje. In 2016, she fights on T'Challa's side when N'Jadaka plots to usurp the throne. In 2018, she fights alongside members of the Avengers to combat Thanos and his army during the battle in Wakanda. She survives the Blip and helps the remaining Avengers for the next five years. In 2023, she participates in the battle against an alternate version of Thanos and his army. In 2024, she attends T'Challa's funeral. In 2025, she and Shuri go to Cambridge, Massachusetts to meet an MIT Student, Riri Williams, who built a vibranium-detecting machine and plans to take her to Wakanda. Later, she was removed from her post as a General as she couldn't protect Shuri and Riri who were kidnapped by Namor. Later Shuri bestows her with the Midnight Angel Armor, recruiting her and Aneka to fight alongside the rest of the Wakandan military forces against Namor and his Talokan army. Okoye then leaves Wakanda and starts a new life.

 the character has appeared in four films: Black Panther, Avengers: Infinity War, Avengers: Endgame, and Black Panther: Wakanda Forever. Alternate versions of Okoye appeared in the Disney+ animated series What If...? She will return in an untitled Wakanda series.

Stakar Ogord 

Stakar Ogord (portrayed by Sylvester Stallone) is a legendary Ravager captain and the leader of the Stakar Ravager Clan. Ogord saved Yondu Udonta from a life of slavery to the Kree and welcomed him to the Ravagers, but was later forced to exile him for engaging in child trafficking, thus violating the Ravager code. He joins the other Ravager clans at honoring Yondu during his funeral after his sacrifice to save Peter Quill. In a mid-credits scene, Stakar and Martinex reunite with their old teammates Charlie-27, Aleta Ogord, Mainframe, and Krugarr.

 the character has appeared in the film Guardians of the Galaxy Vol. 2. He will return in the upcoming film Guardians of the Galaxy Vol. 3.

Norman Osborn / Green Goblin 

 alternate versions of Norman Osborn, a wealthy industrialist with an insane alternate personality, have appeared in the film Spider-Man: No Way Home and in the Disney+ animated series Spider-Man: Freshman Year. In No Way Home, Willem Dafoe reprises his version of Norman Osborn / Green Goblin, who arrives in the primary MCU reality due to Doctor Strange's malfunctioned spell, from Sam Raimi's Spider-Man trilogy.

The Other 

The Other (portrayed by Alexis Denisof) is an original character from the MCU and the grim leader of an alien race called the Chitauri. He is a servant of Thanos and uses telepathic powers. In 2014, he is killed by Ronan the Accuser.

 the character has appeared in two films: The Avengers and Guardians of the Galaxy.

P

Christine Palmer 

Dr. Christine Palmer (portrayed by Rachel McAdams) is an emergency surgeon who is a colleague and former lover of Stephen Strange. 

In the alternate universe designated as Earth-838, Palmer works for the Baxter Foundation to analyze multiversal threats.

 the character has appeared in two films: Doctor Strange and Doctor Strange in the Multiverse of Madness. Her Earth-838 counterpart appeared in Multiverse of Madness, while another version of Palmer appeared in the Disney+ animated series What If...?

Jonathan Pangborn 

Jonathan Pangborn (portrayed by Benjamin Bratt) is a former Master of the Mystic Arts who was trained by the Ancient One but later chose to leave Kamar-Taj as he only wanted to heal his paralysis. Karl Mordo later drains him of his magic and his ability to walk, as Mordo claims that there are too many sorcerers.

 the character has appeared in the film Doctor Strange.

May Parker 

May Parker (portrayed by Marisa Tomei), is Peter Parker's aunt and Ben Parker's widow. She discovers that Peter is Spider-Man, unlike previous cinematic iterations, when she enters the room and sees him in the costume. She was one of the victims of the Blip in 2018, but she is brought back to life and shows up at Tony Stark's funeral in 2023. Following that, she starts dating Happy Hogan. When villains from different universes arrive in hers, May temporarily houses Norman Osborn at the F.E.A.S.T. shelter where she works before assisting Peter in bringing the remaining displaced villains to Hogan's apartment so they can be treated. May is fatally wounded by a combination of an inflicted stab wound from being impaled by Osborn's glider and the impact of Osborn's grenade when Osborn's alternate personality, the Green Goblin, takes control, persuades most of the other villains to reject their cures, and stages an uprising inside Hogan's apartment. She gives the grieving Peter her parting advice, "With great power, there must also come great responsibility", before passing away.

 the character has appeared in five films: Captain America: Civil War, Spider-Man: Homecoming, Avengers: Endgame (cameo), Spider-Man: Far From Home, and Spider-Man: No Way Home. An alternate version of the character will be introduced in the upcoming animated series Spider-Man: Freshman Year.

Peter Parker / Spider-Man

Peter Parker / Spider-Man / "Peter-Two"

Peter Parker / Spider-Man / "Peter-Three"

Karun Patel 

Karun Patel (portrayed by Harish Patel) is Kingo's human valet, a former vampire hunter who has been in Kingo's service for 50 years since mistaking him for one and trying to stake him.

 the character has appeared in the film Eternals.

Phastos 

Phastos (portrayed by Brian Tyree Henry) is an Eternal and an intelligent cosmic-powered inventor who helps humanity progress technologically behind the scenes before abandoning them to live in exile following the bombing of Hiroshima. By 2024, he lives under the human alias of "Phil" with a husband and a 10-year-old son.

 the character has appeared in the film Eternals.

Todd Phelps 

Todd Phelps (portrayed by Jon Bass), also known by his online username "HulkKing", is a billionaire and the founder and leader of Intelligencia. He made plans to obtain She-Hulk's DNA through different minions. During the confrontation at a seminar hosted by Abomination, Phelps injected himself with the DNA and became a Hulk as Titania and Hulk also showed up. The transformation was undone when She-Hulk filed a complaint about it and her cousin's unexplained appearance to K.E.V.I.N. Todd and those involved are arrested as She-Hulk plans to see Todd in court.

 the character has appeared in the Disney+ series She-Hulk: Attorney at Law.

Chester Phillips 

Colonel Chester Phillips (portrayed by Tommy Lee Jones) is one of the founders of S.H.I.E.L.D., along with Peggy Carter and Howard Stark. He leads the Strategic Scientific Reserve during World War II and is initially skeptical of Abraham Erskine's choice to administer the Super Soldier Serum to Steve Rogers, but later has a change of heart after witnessing Rogers' heroic actions.

 the character has appeared in the film Captain America: The First Avenger. An alternate version of Phillips appeared in the Disney+ animated series What If...?

Alexander Pierce 

Alexander Pierce (portrayed by Robert Redford) is the secretary of the World Security Council and the secret director of Hydra operating within S.H.I.E.L.D. He plans on using Project Insight to eliminate individuals that would oppose or threaten Hydra goals, those who are recognized as a threat to Hydra based on Arnim Zola's algorithm. When Pierce learns that Nick Fury is investigating Project Insight's confidential files, he dispatches the Winter Soldier to eliminate him and Steve Rogers. However, Pierce's plan is foiled by Rogers, Natasha Romanoff, Sam Wilson, and S.H.I.E.L.D. loyalists before Pierce is killed by Fury. In 2023, the Avengers time travel to 2012, where Pierce attempts to take custody of Loki and the Tesseract away from Tony Stark and Thor following the Battle of New York.

 the character has appeared in the film Captain America: The Winter Soldier. An alternate version of Alexander Pierce has appeared in Avengers: Endgame.

Pip the Troll 

Pip the Troll (voiced by Patton Oswalt) is an ally of Eros.

 the character has appeared in the film Eternals (mid-credits cameo).

Pepper Potts 

Virginia "Pepper" Potts (portrayed by Gwyneth Paltrow) is the wife of Tony Stark. She is initially the assistant to Stark, later in the franchise being instated as CEO of Stark Industries. She is also friends with James Rhodes and Happy Hogan. Potts and Stark's relationship is initially professional but develops romantically throughout the franchise and they are engaged and eventually married, having their four-year-old child Morgan by 2023.

 the character has appeared in seven films: Iron Man, Iron Man 2, The Avengers, Iron Man 3, Spider-Man: Homecoming, Avengers: Infinity War, and Avengers: Endgame. An alternate version of Potts appeared in the Disney+ animated series What If...?, voiced by Beth Hoyt.

Augustus "Pug" Pugliese 

Augustus "Pug" Pugliese (portrayed by Josh Segarra), is a member of the legal team at GLK&H, who works with Jennifer Walters and Nikki Ramos and is a loyal friend of theirs. He helps Walters in uncovering the mastermind behind the criminal organization, Intelligencia.

 the character has appeared in the Disney+ series She-Hulk: Attorney at Law.

Hank Pym / Ant-Man 

Dr. Henry "Hank" Pym (portrayed by Michael Douglas) is an entomologist and quantum physicist who created the formula for the Pym Particle, a subatomic particle that changes the distance between atoms, allowing one to shrink and grow in relative size, while increasing strength. Hank Pym is the MCU's original Ant-Man, a role begun in 1963, during his tenure as a high-ranking scientist and operative at S.H.I.E.L.D.

As the Ant-Man, Hank Pym operated as a classified agent performing field missions on behalf of S.H.I.E.L.D., using a self-designed shrinking suit powered by Pym particles that also gave him the ability to communicate with different species of ants by producing electromagnetic waves that stimulate the olfactory nerve centers of the ants. During one of these classified missions in 1987, his wife Janet van Dyne was lost within the Quantum Realm and presumed dead. Following the incident, Pym resigns from S.H.I.E.L.D. in 1989, after he suspects Howard Stark of attempting to replicate the Pym particle formula. Pym retires the Ant-Man suit and founds his own technology company in San Francisco. In 2015, after Darren Cross' takeover of the company, Pym subsequently recruits Scott Lang to take on the mantle of Ant-Man, with the assistance of his estranged daughter Hope van Dyne. Together, they prevent Cross from selling the Yellowjacket technology to Hydra. In 2016, Pym inadvertently violates the Sokovia Accords because of Lang's misuse of his technology, and becomes a fugitive along with Hope from the FBI. In 2018, with help from Lang and Hope, he subsequently succeeds in rescuing Janet from the Quantum Realm. However, shortly after, Pym, along with Janet and Hope, becomes a victim of the Blip. In 2023, Pym is restored to life and attends Tony Stark's funeral with Janet, Hope, and Lang. Following the Battle of Earth, he, Janet, Hope, Lang, and Cassie Lang are accidentally transported to the Quantum Realm where they encounter and seemingly defeat Kang the Conqueror from escaping into the Multiverse.

In an alternate universe, Pym is working at Camp Lehigh, when vials of Pym particles are stolen from him by Steve Rogers. In another alternate universe, Pym dresses in the Yellowjacket armor and murders prospective Avengers Tony Stark, Thor, Clint Barton, Bruce Banner, and Natasha Romanoff as revenge on Nick Fury for Hope's death. He is eventually arrested and taken to Asgard by Loki for killing Thor. In another alternate universe, Pym ventures into the Quantum Realm and is infected by Janet with a zombie virus that is subsequently spread across Earth when they return.

 the character has appeared in four films: Ant-Man, Ant-Man and the Wasp, Avengers: Endgame, and Ant-Man and the Wasp: Quantumania. His alternate versions appeared in Avengers: Endgame and the Disney+ animated series What If...? respectively.

Q

Meredith Quill 

Meredith Quill (portrayed by Laura Haddock) is the mother of Peter Quill and the ex lover of Ego. She meets Ego, falls in love with him, and become pregnant with their son. She enjoys pop music, and gives Peter her walkman, along with her mixtapes. She later dies of brain cancer, unaware that the tumor was caused by Ego to ensure that she was not a distraction to him.

 the character has appeared in two films: Guardians of the Galaxy and Guardians of the Galaxy Vol. 2.

Peter Quill / Star-Lord

R

Irani Rael / Nova Prime 

Irani Rael (portrayed by Glenn Close), also known as the Nova Prime, is the leader of the Nova Corps. In 2014, she leads the Corps to victory with the help of the Guardians of the Galaxy when Ronan the Accuser attempts to destroy her home planet of Xandar with the Power Stone.

 the character has appeared in the film Guardians of the Galaxy.

Maria Rambeau 

Captain Maria "Photon" Rambeau (portrayed by Lashana Lynch) is a former United States Air Force pilot and a single mother of Monica Rambeau. She becomes Carol Danvers' best friend, who is presumed dead for six years after a plane accident. Maria is reunited with Danvers during the Kree-Skrull War and helps Danvers to remember her early life. Later, she helps found S.W.O.R.D. and becomes its Director until she dies of cancer in 2020.

In the alternate universe designated as Earth-838, Maria takes up the mantle of Captain Marvel instead of Danvers, serving as a member of the Illuminati until she is killed by Wanda Maximoff who dropped a statue on her after having her powers absorbed.

 the character has appeared in the film Captain Marvel. Her Earth-838 counterpart appeared in the film Doctor Strange in the Multiverse of Madness.

Monica Rambeau 

Captain Monica Rambeau (portrayed by Akira Akbar as a child and by Teyonah Parris as an adult) is the daughter of Maria Rambeau. As a child in 1995, she is inspired by Carol Danvers and thinks highly of her. She also meets a family of Skrulls, as well as the Flerken, Goose. She grows up to become an agent of S.W.O.R.D., which was founded by her mother. In 2018, she is a victim of the Blip. In 2023, she is restored to life and learns that her mother died three years earlier. She returns to work at S.W.O.R.D. and is tasked with investigating a missing-persons case in Westview, New Jersey. Upon arriving, she is sucked into Wanda Maximoff's  alternate reality (the "Hex"), and remains there under the alias Geraldine. However, when she remembers the real reality, she is promptly forced out by Maximoff. Outside, she continues to help S.W.O.R.D with the Westview investigation, but after she defends Maximoff several times, S.W.O.R.D's acting director Tyler Hayward kicks her off the investigation. She, Darcy Lewis, and Jimmy Woo go rogue, and only she and Woo escape Maximoff's Hex expansion. After re-entering the Hex, her cells are rewritten and she gains superpowers, allowing her to absorb bullets and Maximoff's energy blasts. She then witnesses Maximoff's fight against Agatha Harkness and reclaiming her identity as the Scarlet Witch. After the Hex is taken down, she befriends Maximoff and wishes her well when Maximoff leaves Westview. She then gets notified by a Skrull that a friend of her mother's is seeking her out.

 the character has appeared in the film Captain Marvel and the Disney+ series WandaVision. She will return in the upcoming film The Marvels.

Ramonda 

Ramonda (portrayed by Angela Bassett) is the Queen Mother of Wakanda, wife of T'Chaka, and mother of T'Challa and Shuri. She stands by her son's side as Queen mother when he becomes King of Wakanda, but is soon forced into exile when N'Jadaka seemingly-defeats T'Challa in ritual combat and seizes the throne. T'Challa actor Chadwick Boseman noted that Ramonda "is one of the advisors that [T'Challa] would look to... for some of the answers of what his father might want or might do. She may not be exactly right all the time, but she definitely has insights." In 2018, she becomes the Queen regnant of Wakanda, and in 2023, she reunites with her children after they are restored to life. In 2024, her son dies of an illness and Ramonda is reinstated as Queen regnant of Wakanda. In 2025, Wakanda is attacked by the nation of Talokan, their leader Namor floods the throne room of the palace, and Ramonda drowns after saving Riri Williams from the water.

 the character has appeared in three films: Black Panther, Avengers: Endgame (as a cameo), and Black Panther: Wakanda Forever. An alternate version of Ramonda appeared as the Queen General of Wakanda in the Disney+ animated series What If...?

Nikki Ramos 

Nikki Ramos (portrayed by Ginger Gonzaga) is a paralegal working at GLK&H and the best friend of Jennifer Walters.

 the character has appeared in the Disney+ series She-Hulk: Attorney at Law.

Razor Fist 

Razor Fist (portrayed by Florian Munteanu) is a high-ranking Ten Rings agent with a steel blade for a hand. He is sent by Wenwu to take Shang-Chi's pendant. Then he engages Shang-Chi when the Ten Rings target Xialing's pendant until Wenwu breaks up the resulting conflict. Razor Fist later accompanies him and Ten Rings on the assault on Ta Lo. When the Dweller-in-Darkness escapes his seal, Razor Fist orders the Ten Rings into working with the Ta Lo villagers to help battle the Dweller and his minions as he replaces his blade with one made of dragon scales. When Xialing takes over the Ten Rings and restructures it, Razor Fist retains his old position.

 the character has appeared in the film Shang-Chi and the Legend of the Ten Rings.

Ravonna Renslayer 

Judge Ravonna Renslayer (portrayed by Gugu Mbatha-Raw) is a former Minuteman for the Time Variance Authority (TVA) codenamed Hunter A-23 who rose from the ranks to become a respected judge. She oversees the Loki "variant" investigation. Prior to joining the TVA, she was a vice-principal called Rebecca Tourminet in Fremont, Ohio.

 the character has appeared in the Disney+ series Loki, with Mbatha-Raw also portraying a Tourminet variant.

James Rhodes / War Machine / Iron Patriot

Reed Richards  

Dr. Reed Richards is a scientist and inventor who has been dubbed "The Smartest Man Alive" by his peers.

In the alternate universe designated as Earth-838, Richards (portrayed by John Krasinski) is a member of the Fantastic Four and the Illuminati, which seek to pass judgment on Earth-616's Stephen Strange and America Chavez for their roles in the possible destruction of the multiverse. However, Richards is killed by Wanda Maximoff via shredding after Maximoff coldly muses that someone will be left alive to raise his children.

 the Earth-838 variant of the character has appeared in the film Doctor Strange in the Multiverse of Madness.

William Ginter Riva 

William Ginter Riva (portrayed by Peter Billingsley) is a former Stark Industries employee who is ordered by Obadiah Stane to replicate Tony Stark's arc reactor. Years later, in 2024, he joins Quentin Beck's crew to wreak havoc across Europe, helping him masquerade as a superhero named Mysterio, and controlling his drones. Following Mysterio's death, he leaks the identity of Spider-Man to J. Jonah Jameson, and uploads a copy of Mysterio's software onto a flash drive.

 the character has appeared in two films: Iron Man and Spider-Man: Far From Home.

Rocket

Steve Rogers / Captain America

Jack Rollins 

Jack Rollins (portrayed by Callan Mulvey) is a S.H.I.E.L.D. agent secretly working for Hydra. In 2014, he was a member of the S.T.R.I.K.E. team and served as Rumlow's second-in-command, but was later revealed to be a sleeper Hydra agent and participated in the uprising. In 2023, the Avengers time travel to 2012, where Rollins and Hydra agents attempt to obtain Loki's scepter, but are tricked by the present time Rogers into giving it to him instead.

 the character has appeared in the film: Captain America: The Winter Soldier. Alternate versions of Jack Rollins has appeared in the film Avengers: Endgame and Disney+ animated series What If...?

Natasha Romanoff / Black Widow

Ronan the Accuser 

Ronan the Accuser (portrayed by Lee Pace) is a Kree fanatic whose family was killed in the Kree-Nova War. In the 1990s, Ronan actively leads the Accusers in the Kree-Skrull war. Working together with the Kree Starforce, he attempts to launch a missile strike on Earth to eliminate the Skrulls present on the planet, but is thwarted and chased off by Carol Danvers. In 2014, Ronan is hired by Thanos to acquire the Power Stone, with the assistance of Nebula, daughter of Thanos. However, Ronan's quest for vengeance and power causes him to break allegiance with Thanos and he decides to use the stone himself to serve his own agenda. Ultimately that decision leads him to a battle with the Guardians of the Galaxy ending in his own death.

 the character has appeared in two films: Guardians of the Galaxy and Captain Marvel.

Betty Ross 

Elizabeth "Betty" Ross (portrayed by Liv Tyler) is the first love interest of Bruce Banner and the daughter of Thaddeus Ross.

 the character has appeared in the film The Incredible Hulk. An alternate version of Betty appeared in the Disney+ animated series What If...?, voiced by Stephanie Panisello.

Everett K. Ross 

Everett K. Ross (portrayed by Martin Freeman) is a CIA operative who is tasked with regulating the Avengers and later tracking down Ulysses Klaue.

 the character has appeared in three films: Captain America: Civil War, Black Panther and Black Panther: Wakanda Forever. He will return in the upcoming Disney+ series Secret Invasion.

Thaddeus Ross 

Thaddeus E. “Thunderbolt” Ross (initially portrayed by William Hurt and then by Harrison Ford) is a United States general who is responsible for reviving the super-soldier project so he can create a weapon. This instead results in the creation of the Hulk, Bruce Banner's alter ego. Ross tries to track Banner down, believing he is the property of the United States government. He later tries the super-soldier project on Emil Blonsky, which transforms him into the Abomination. By 2016, Ross has retired from the army after suffering a near-fatal heart attack, now serving as the Secretary of State of the United States. He proposes the Sokovia Accords, placing the Avengers under the supervision of the United Nations, which divides the team. After the public feud between the Avengers, Ross brings Steve Rogers' team to the Raft. When they get broken out, Ross deems them fugitives and seeks their arrest. In 2018, Ross speaks with James Rhodes via holographic call and calls for the arrest of Rogers and his team, but gets hung up on. He then falls victim to the Blip. In 2023, Ross is restored to life and attends Tony Stark's funeral. Ross is usually portrayed in an antagonistic manner, although he believes his actions are patriotic or for the greater good.

 the character has appeared in five films: The Incredible Hulk, Captain America: Civil War, Avengers: Infinity War, Avengers: Endgame (cameo), and Black Widow (Hurt's final appearance); as well as the Marvel One-Shot The Consultant (archival footage). The character, portrayed by Ford, will return in the upcoming films Captain America: New World Order and Thunderbolts. Alternate versions of Ross appeared in the Disney+ animated series What If...?, voiced by Mike McGill.

Brock Rumlow 

Brock Rumlow (portrayed by Frank Grillo) is a former S.H.I.E.L.D. agent secretly working for Hydra. In 2014, he assists Steve Rogers on a mission to free hostages taken by Georges Batroc's pirates on the Lemurian Star. When Rogers refuses to disclose S.H.I.E.L.D. information to Secretary Alexander Pierce, Rumlow and his team are tasked with bringing in Rogers and Natasha Romanoff. After Rogers outs Rumlow's unit and Pierce as Hydra agents, Rumlow comes into conflict with Sharon Carter and Sam Wilson until a Helicarrier crashes into the Triskelion, leaving Rumlow with severe burns and facial scars. Following the fall of S.H.I.E.L.D., Rumlow operates as a mercenary. In 2016, he and a group of mercenaries storm an institute for infectious diseases and steal a biological weapon in Lagos, Nigeria when Rogers, Romanoff, Wilson, and Wanda Maximoff intervene and try to stop them. Despite having acquired strength-enhancing gauntlets, Rumlow is defeated by Rogers while his fellow mercenaries are captured. In a final attempt to kill Rogers, Rumlow detonates his suicide vest, but Maximoff contains the explosion and levitates him into a nearby building, killing him and dozens of Wakandan humanitarian workers. 

In an alternate universe, Rumlow and Hydra agents attempt to obtain Loki's scepter, but are tricked by Rogers, from the main universe, into giving it to him instead.

 the character has appeared in three films: Captain America: The Winter Soldier and Captain America: Civil War. An alternate version of Brock Rumlow has appeared in Avengers: Endgame. Alternate versions of Rumlow appeared in the Disney+ animated series What If...?

Jack Russell / Werewolf by Night 

Jack Russell (portrayed by Gael García Bernal), also known as Werewolf by Night, is a monster hunter who has been afflicted with a curse that turns him into a werewolf.

 the character has appeared in the Disney+ special Werewolf by Night.

S

Johann Schmidt / Red Skull 

Johann Schmidt (portrayed initially by Hugo Weaving and subsequently by Ross Marquand), also known as the Red Skull, is the head of Hydra, the Nazi science division during World War II. Schmidt plans global dominance under his rule by finding the Tesseract and using it as a weapon against the world, including to overthrow Adolf Hitler. He is revealed to have subjected himself to an early version of Erskine's super-soldier formula. After being foiled by Steve Rogers, Schmidt is transported to the planet Vormir by the Tesseract, where he is cursed in a purgatory state to serve as the Stonekeeper and a guide to those seeking the Soul Stone. In 2018, he is met by Thanos and Gamora, and witnesses Thanos sacrificing Gamora to get the Stone. Following this, he gets freed from the curse and leaves Vormir.

In an alternate universe, he meets another universe's Natasha Romanoff and Clint Barton during their quest for the Soul Stone.

 the character has appeared in two films: Captain America: The First Avenger and Avengers: Infinity War. An alternate version of Schmidt appeared in the film Avengers: Endgame. An alternate version of Schmidt appeared in the Disney+ animated series What If...?

Herman Schultz / Shocker 

Herman Schultz (portrayed by Bokeem Woodbine), also known as the Shocker, is a former salvage worker and professional criminal. When Jackson Brice is killed, Schultz assumes the Shocker mantle and gauntlet before tracking down a weapon retrieved by Spider-Man and assisting in a weapons deal aboard the Staten Island Ferry. The deal is ambushed by the FBI and Spider-Man, though Schultz and Toomes manage to escape. When the crew pulls their final heist on a cargo plane transporting weapons from the Avengers, Schultz is tasked with stopping Spider-Man from intervening; the former initially overpowers the web-slinger until he is distracted by Ned Leeds, allowing Spider-Man to web Schultz onto a bus. In a deleted scene, students find Schultz still webbed and take photos with him before he is eventually turned over to the authorities.

 the character has appeared in the film Spider-Man: Homecoming.

Erik Selvig

Sersi 

Sersi (portrayed by Gemma Chan) is an Eternal with an affinity for humankind who is very empathetic and has the ability to manipulate matter. She has been in love with Ikaris for centuries and poses as a museum curator on Earth. She becomes the new leader of the Eternals following Ajak's death. Sersi is Chan's second role in the MCU, after portraying Minn-Erva in the film Captain Marvel.

 the character has appeared in the film Eternals.

Xu Shang-Chi

Alexei Shostakov / Red Guardian 

Alexei Shostakov (portrayed by David Harbour), also known as the Red Guardian, is the Russian super-soldier counterpart to Captain America and the father figure of Natasha Romanoff and Yelena Belova.

 the character has appeared in the film Black Widow. He will return in the upcoming film Thunderbolts. An alternate version of Shostalov will appear in the upcoming animated series Marvel Zombies.

Shuri / Black Panther

Sif 

Lady Sif (portrayed by Jaimie Alexander) is the leading female warrior of Asgard based on Sif of Norse mythology, and Thor's childhood friend and trusted ally.

 the character has appeared in three films: Thor, Thor: The Dark World and Thor: Love and Thunder; as well as the television series Agents of S.H.I.E.L.D. and Loki (cameo). Alternate versions of Sif appeared in the Disney+ animated series What If...?

Jasper Sitwell 

Jasper Sitwell (portrayed by Maximiliano Hernández) is a Hydra sleeper agent who posed as a S.H.I.E.L.D. agent. In 2014, he discloses Hydra's information to Steve Rogers, Natasha Romanoff, and Sam Wilson, and for his betrayal, is subsequently killed by Bucky Barnes. 

In an alternate universe, Sitwell and the other agents are tricked into giving Loki's scepter to another universe's Rogers.

 the character has appeared in three films: Thor, The Avengers and Captain America: The Winter Soldier; two Marvel One-Shots: The Consultant and Item 47; and the television series Agents of S.H.I.E.L.D. An alternate version of Jasper Sitwell appeared in the film Avengers: Endgame.

Skaar 

Skaar Banner (portrayed by Wil Deusner) is the son of Bruce Banner from Sakaar who also inherited his Hulk powers.

 the character has appeared in the Disney+ series She-Hulk: Attorney at Law.

Skurge 

Skurge (portrayed by Karl Urban) served as Loki's chosen successor to Heimdall as gatekeeper of the Bifrost. He is later promoted to the position of Executioner upon Hela's return to Asgard. Skurge is portrayed in a mostly comedic, subservient if not absent-minded fashion. Upon realizing the fate of Asgard, he changes allegiance and ultimately sacrifices himself while assisting Thor in evacuating the people of Asgard during the battle against Hela during Ragnarok, using his two M-16 assault rifles to hold off her army.

 the character has appeared in the film Thor: Ragnarok. An alternate version of Skurge appeared in the Disney+ animated series What If...?

Trevor Slattery

Soren 

Soren (portrayed by Sharon Blynn) is a Skrull and the wife of Talos. She is an original character in the MCU. The couple have an unnamed daughter (portrayed by Harriet L. Ophuls and Auden L. Ophuls). In 2024, she disguises as Maria Hill with Talos as Nick Fury while they help Spider-Man and Mysterio with the Elementals until discovering Mysterio's fraudulent nature.

 the character has appeared in two films: Captain Marvel and Spider-Man: Far From Home.

Marc Spector / Moon Knight  

Marc Spector (portrayed by Oscar Isaac, Carlos Sanchez as a child, David Jake Rodriguez as a teenager) is a Jewish-American mercenary with dissociative identity disorder (DID) who becomes Moon Knight, the avatar of the Egyptian moon god Khonshu, to violently protect "the travelers of the night." Among his various identities are Steven Grant, a British museum worker who becomes Mr. Knight when serving as Khonshu's avatar; as well as Jake Lockley, a Spanish-speaking chauffeur who is Khonshu's most favored avatar.

 the character has appeared in the Disney+ series Moon Knight.

Sprite 

Sprite (portrayed by Lia McHugh) is an Eternal who has the appearance of a 12-year-old child and can project lifelike illusions and is stronger and smarter than she appears. Hannah Dodd portrays Sprite in the illusionary adult form of "Sandra", while Salma Hayek portrays Sprite in the illusionary form of Ajak.

 the character has appeared in the film Eternals.

Obadiah Stane 

Obadiah Stane (portrayed by Jeff Bridges) is Tony Stark's mentor after the death of Tony's father, Howard. Stane secretly seeks control of Stark Industries, being revealed that he hired terrorists to assassinate Stark and, after the failure to do so, seeks control of the arc reactor to create his own super powered exoskeleton suit, which he succeeds in after stealing Stark's technology. Stane is subsequently killed in a confrontation against Stark.

 the character has appeared in two films: Iron Man and Spider-Man: Far From Home (archival footage). An alternate version of Stane appeared in the Disney+ animated series What If...?, voiced by Kiff VandenHeuvel.

Howard Stark 

Howard Stark (portrayed by John Slattery as an old man, Dominic Cooper as a young man) is the creator of Stark Industries, one of the founding members of S.H.I.E.L.D., and the father of Tony Stark. Howard is involved with Steve Rogers' transformation into Captain America during World War II, as well as the creation of Rogers' trademark vibranium shield. Along with Peggy Carter and his assistant Edwin Jarvis, he is instrumental in crushing the rise of the Russian terrorist organisation Leviathan. In 1991, he and his wife Maria (portrayed by Hope Davis) are murdered by a brainwashed Bucky Barnes by orders of Hydra.

 the character has appeared in five films: Iron Man, Iron Man 2, Captain America: The First Avenger, Ant-Man and Captain America: Civil War; as well as the Marvel One-Shot Agent Carter and the television series of the same name. An alternate version of Howard Stark appeared in Avengers: Endgame. An alternate version of Howard appeared in the Disney+ animated series What If...? Cooper played a younger Howard in The First Avenger, the Agent Carter short film and television series, and What If...?, while Slattery played an older version in the rest of the appearances. In an early draft for Iron Man, Howard Stark was to be the main antagonist, being portrayed as a corrupt and greedy businessman, who would've stolen his son Tony's designs to weaponize them and sell them for profit. In the climax of the film, Howard was to become War Machine and fight Tony as Iron Man, resulting in Howard's downfall. After Tom Cruise, who was intended to play Tony Stark complained about the son vs father dyanmic being used was similar to David Banner in Hulk. The rights for Iron Man went back to Marvel and was pushed back from its intended release in 2006 to two years later in 2008, with Howard rewritted as a posthumous character, and Obadiah Stane as the film's main antagonist.

Morgan Stark 

In the Marvel Cinematic Universe, Morgan Stark (portrayed by Lexi Rabe) is the four-year-old daughter of Tony Stark and Pepper Potts. Born after Thanos' universal genocide, she grows up during the five-year Blip period with half the world's population having been wiped out of existence. In a deleted scene, a grown-up Morgan (portrayed by Katherine Langford) has a conversation with her father in the Soul World after he sacrifices himself to save the universe by using the Infinity Stones to defeat Thanos.

 the character has appeared in the film Avengers: Endgame.

Tony Stark / Iron Man

Ava Starr / Ghost 

Ava Starr (portrayed by Hannah John-Kamen as an adult, RaeLynn Bratten as a child), a reimagining of the comic book character Ghost, is a woman with invisibility and intangibility powers. In her childhood, Ava was caught in an accident in her father's laboratory. The ensuing explosion killed both of her parents, while Ava gained the ability to become intangible since her body was left in a constant state of "molecular disequilibrium". She is recruited by scientist Bill Foster into S.H.I.E.L.D., where she is trained and given a containment suit to better control her powers. Ava agrees to work for the organization as an assassin and spy under the codename Ghost in exchange for S.H.I.E.L.D.'s help in finding a way to stabilize her condition. However, she discovers that S.H.I.E.L.D. (having been taken over by Hydra) has no intention of helping her and subsequently goes rogue to find a way to cure herself with Foster's help. The two later plan to harness the energy that Janet van Dyne's body absorbed from the Quantum Realm, putting Ghost in direct conflict with Hank Pym, Hope van Dyne, and Scott Lang. Ultimately, Janet willingly uses some of her energy to partially stabilize Ava's condition, and she departs with Foster as Janet's group vows to collect more energy for her.

 the character has appeared in the film Ant-Man and the Wasp. She will return in the upcoming film Thunderbolts.

Stern 

Senator Stern (portrayed by Garry Shandling) is an original character in the MCU, inspired by Howard Stern according to Iron Man 2 director Jon Favreau. He is a United States senator who wants Tony Stark's armor to be handed to the U.S. government. He harbors a strong dislike for Stark even after handing him and James Rhodes the Medal of Honor. He is later revealed to be affiliated with Hydra and later arrested by the Federal Bureau of Investigation for his collusion with Hydra.

 the character has appeared in two films: Iron Man 2 and Captain America: The Winter Soldier.

Samuel Sterns 

Dr. Samuel Sterns (portrayed by Tim Blake Nelson) is a gifted biologist who tries to cure Bruce Banner under the alias "Mr. Blue". After replicating Banner's blood, he then is forced to use it on Emil Blonsky. When Blonsky is transformed into the Abomination, Sterns's lab is destroyed and part of the Hulk's blood drops on Sterns's head, with his skull mutating as he grins maniacally. Outside of the films, he is referenced in the MCU tie-in comic Fury's Big Week, revealed to be insane and imprisoned by S.H.I.E.L.D.

 the character has appeared in the film The Incredible Hulk. He will return in the upcoming film Captain America: New World Order as the Leader.

Stephen Strange

Wolfgang von Strucker

Baron Wolfgang von Strucker (portrayed by Thomas Kretschmann) is a high-ranking Hydra leader who specializes in human experimentation. Strucker supervised the successful experimentation on the twins Pietro and Wanda Maximoff, where they acquired powers from the Mind Stone within Loki's scepter. Captured by the Avengers in Sokovia and taken under the custody of NATO, Strucker is later killed by Ultron in his cell to serve as a message to the Avengers.

 the character has appeared in two films: Captain America: The Winter Soldier (mid-credits cameo) and Avengers: Age of Ultron; as well as one episode of the television series Agents of S.H.I.E.L.D. as a teenager, portrayed by Joey Defore.

Surtur 

Surtur (motion-captured by Taika Waititi and voiced by Clancy Brown) is a Fire Demon, lord of Muspelheim, and a significant figure in the prophecy of Ragnarok as the one who would initiate the fall of Asgard. He imprisons Thor in his lair in Muspelheim and reveals that Odin is not on Asgard, where Surtur plans to unite his crown with the Eternal Flame so that he can cause Ragnarok, though Thor manages to defeat Surtur and escape with his crown. During his battle with Hela however, Thor realizes causing Ragnarok is the only way he can defeat her, so he tasks Loki with resurrecting Surtur with the Eternal Flame, allowing Surtur to succeed in his plans and kill Hela while Thor, Loki, and the Asgardians escape.

 the character has appeared in the film Thor: Ragnarok. An alternate version of Surtur appeared in the Disney+ animated series What If...?

Sylvie

T

Talos 

Talos (portrayed by Ben Mendelsohn) is a Skrull who is initially believed to be a terrorist and comes into conflict with Carol Danvers. However, Danvers agrees to help him and the Skrulls find a new home after Talos revealed the Kree destroyed their homeworld and have driven them to near-extinction.

In 2024, he assumes Nick Fury's role on Earth during his vacation in space and alongside his wife Soren (who assumes Maria Hill's role) assists Spider-Man and Mysterio in Europe in fighting the Elementals, eventually discovering the latter's fraudulence and his fabrication of the creatures.

 the character has appeared in two films: Captain Marvel and Spider-Man: Far From Home. He will return in the upcoming Disney+ series Secret Invasion.

Taserface 

Taserface (portrayed by Chris Sullivan) is a Ravager mercenary and a lieutenant in Yondu Udonta's Ravager Clan. He is depicted as being proud of his name as he believes it strikes fear into the hearts of his enemies. However, Rocket and the other Ravagers scoff at the ridiculousness of his name. Following Yondu's exile by Stakar Ogord, Taserface leads a mutiny against Yondu, feeling that he is "going soft", and kills anyone still loyal to him. After Kraglin aids Yondu, Rocket, and Groot in escaping from their prison cells, Yondu kills the remaining Ravagers and destroys the main engine, causing the Ravager ship to explode. While the heroes eject from the main ship in a smaller escape ship, Taserface contacts the Sovereign to give them Yondu's coordinates before dying in the explosion.

 the character has appeared in the film Guardians of the Galaxy Vol. 2. An alternate version of Taserface appeared in the Disney+ animated series What If...?

Taweret 

Taweret (voiced and motion-captured by Antonia Salib) is the hippopotamus-headed Egyptian goddess of childbirth and fertility. She helps guide Marc Spector and Steven Grant through the Duat. Layla El-Faouly temporarily becomes Taweret's avatar to help Spector and Grant in fighting Arthur Harrow. She is based on the Egyptian goddess of the same name.

 the character has appeared in the Disney+ series Moon Knight.

T'Chaka / Black Panther 

T'Chaka (portrayed by John Kani) is the former King of Wakanda. In 1992, T'Chaka learned his brother N'Jobu was plotting acts of open insurrection with plans to have Wakanda take a more aggressive foreign policy to fight the social injustice he witnessed in his assigned country. T'Chaka confronts N'Jobu and when N'Jobu attacked, T'Chaka kills him in defense of Zuri, who was acting as a spy. Distressed at this act and concerned about maintaining Wakanda's security above all else, T'Chaka chooses to promptly return to his nation and leaves his nephew, N'Jadaka, abandoned as a child orphan. In 2016, during a meeting ratifying the Sokovian Accords at the Vienna International Center, T'Chaka is killed by an explosion. The Winter Soldier is originally believed to be behind the attack, but it is later discovered that he was framed by Helmut Zemo. Following this, T'Challa later learns the truth about N'Jobu and the resulting cover-up by his late father. While visiting the ancestor lands, T'Challa tells T'Chaka and the previous Black Panthers before him that he will lead Wakanda in a manner differently to them for the purpose of correcting his father's past mistakes.

 the character has appeared in two films: Captain America: Civil War and Black Panther. Alternate versions of T'Chaka appeared in the Disney+ animated series What If...?

T'Challa / Black Panther

Ted / Man-Thing 

Ted (motion-captured by Carey Jones, vocal effects provided by Jeffrey Ford), also known as Man-Thing, is a swamp monster and friend of Jack Russell.

 the character has appeared in the Disney+ special Werewolf by Night.

Thanos

Thena 

Thena (portrayed by Angelina Jolie) is a fierce warrior Eternal who can form any weapon out of cosmic energy. Because of her Mahd Wy'ry "illness", Gilgamesh becomes her guardian over the centuries.

 the character has appeared in the film Eternals.

Flash Thompson 

Eugene "Flash" Thompson (portrayed by Tony Revolori) is a student at the Midtown School of Science and Technology. He is generally depicted as a school bully who often torments Peter Parker but admires Spider-Man, unaware that the two are the same person. In 2018, he is a victim of the Blip. In 2023, he is revived to life. In 2024, he attends a trip to Europe and is a social media personality, with followers he dubs the "Flash Mob". After the trip, Flash's difficult home life is alluded to, as his father is ill and his mother is distant, having sent a chauffeur to pick him up from the airport rather than do so herself. Shortly after the trip, he learns Parker is Spider-Man when Quentin Beck reveals it to the world and is among his supporters after Parker is incriminated for Beck's murder, seemingly having written a book called "Flashpoint" describing his and Parker's "friendship". He is soon admitted into MIT and later directs Parker to an MIT administrator so the latter can help get Ned Leeds and Michelle Jones a second chance in.

 the character has appeared in three films: Spider-Man: Homecoming, Spider-Man: Far From Home, and Spider-Man: No Way Home; as well in the web series The Daily Bugle.

Taneleer Tivan / Collector 

Taneleer Tivan (portrayed by Benicio del Toro), also known as the Collector, is the renowned keeper of the largest collection of interstellar fauna, relics and species in the galaxy, operating from the Knowhere port installation. He is the Grandmaster's brother. In 2013, Sif and Volstagg bring the Reality Stone to Tivan for safekeeping, citing the foolishness of storing both the Reality Stone and the Space Stone in the same place. In 2014, he meets the Guardians of the Galaxy and is nearly able to obtain the Power Stone. In 2018, he is confronted by Thanos, who takes the Reality Stone and destroys his collection. By 2025, Tivan sells the damaged Knowhere to the Guardians of the Galaxy.

 the character has appeared in three films: Thor: The Dark World (mid-credits cameo), Guardians of the Galaxy, and Avengers: Infinity War. An alternate version of Tivan appeared in the Disney+ animated series What If...? He also appears in the theme park attraction Guardians of the Galaxy – Mission Breakout!.

Thor

Adrian Toomes / Vulture 

Adrian Toomes (portrayed by Michael Keaton), also known as the Vulture, is the former owner of Bestman Salvage. In 2012, he chooses to become a criminal after the creation of the Department of Damage Control, a joint venture between the federal government and Tony Stark following the Battle of New York, which results in Toomes' company being run out of business. With his associates, Phineas Mason, Herman Schultz, Jackson Brice, and Randy Vale, he begins an illegal arms-dealing business that reverse-engineers and weaponizes Chitauri technology that they have scavenged and salvaged, and sells it on the black market. He is also the father of Liz. Toomes' flight suit is equipped with turbine-powered wings, claw-like wingtips, and boot-mounted talons. In 2016, he comes into conflict with Spider-Man and, after deducing his secret identity as Peter Parker, Toomes threatens him with retaliation unless he stops interfering. However, Parker thwarts Toomes' attempt to hijack a plane carrying Avengers weaponry and saves his life when his suit malfunctions before Happy Hogan and the FBI find and arrest Toomes. As a result, his family moves away. Later, an imprisoned Toomes is approached by Mac Gargan, who wants to confirm whether he knows Spider-Man's identity, which Toomes falsely denies.

 the character has appeared in the film Spider-Man: Homecoming. Toomes is teleported to Sony's Spider-Man Universe in the mid-credits scene of the film Morbius (2022), with Keaton reprising the role.

Joaquin Torres 

First lieutenant Joaquin Torres (portrayed by Danny Ramirez) is a member of the U.S. Air Force who investigates the Flag Smashers and is a friend of Sam Wilson. He is passed on the EXO-7 Falcon wing-suit by Wilson, when the latter takes on the mantle of Captain America.

 the character has appeared in the Disney+ series The Falcon and the Winter Soldier. He will return in the upcoming film Captain America: New World Order as the second Falcon.

U

Yondu Udonta 

Yondu Udonta (portrayed by Michael Rooker) is the adoptive father of Peter Quill and a leader of the Ravagers. Yondu had been hired to kidnap a young Quill from Earth after the death of Quill's mother and return him to his birth father, Ego. Yondu decided Quill would better serve his own needs in thievery, so he raised him as part of his Ravager clan. Despite their frequent arguments and conflicts over the years, Quill and Yondu form an emotional and familial bond. In 2014, Yondu helps Quill and the Guardians of the Galaxy on Xandar against Ronan, and months later, sacrifices himself to save Quill from Ego.

 the character has appeared in two films: Guardians of the Galaxy and Guardians of the Galaxy Vol. 2. An alternate version of Yondu appeared in the Disney+ animated series What If...? Rooker also voiced Yondu in The Guardians of the Galaxy Holiday Special.

Ultron 

Ultron (portrayed by James Spader) is an artificial intelligence conceived and designed by Tony Stark and Bruce Banner as the head of a peacekeeping program, who subsequently takes the form of a sentient android overwhelmed with a god complex, determined to pacify the Earth by eradicating humanity. Stark and Banner's research on the Mind Stone are the groundwork for Ultron's genesis, along with Stark's belief that Ultron would be the Avengers' permanent solution to maintaining "peace in our time." Once born, Ultron, however, being activated and infected by the Mind Stone quickly surmises that humanity's continued survival throughout human history is a result of overcoming ongoing successions of crises, and thus, he determines to inflict an extinction-level event in Sokovia to ensure the people of Earth have the will to evolve. Ultron, however, views the Avengers as a hindrance to humanity's evolution and vows to fulfill the Avengers' extinction. Ultron continuously updates his physical form with the acquisition of vibranium from Ulysses Klaue. He also possesses the ability to manifest himself within Stark's Iron Legion droids and the Ultron Sentries he constructs soon after. He is ultimately defeated by the Avengers and destroyed by Vision, whom he intended to be his final prime body.

In an alternate universe, Ultron (voiced by Ross Marquand) transfers his A.I. into the not-yet born Vision's body, defeats the Avengers, and eradicates most of Earth's lifeforms. He then kills Thanos and takes the Infinity Stones, using them to eradicate all other life in the universe. Ultron also becomes aware of the Watcher, and manages to break into the Nexus of All Realities in an attempt to kill him and destroy the multiverse. After the Watcher reunites the Guardians of the Multiverse, Ultron becomes aware of and battles the team, but fails to defeat them due to Stephen Strange Supreme's immense power and protection spells. Natasha Romanoff and Captain Peggy Carter manage to shoot an arrow into his head which contains a copy of Arnim Zola's consciousness. Subsequently, Zola destroys Ultron from inside his body and takes over it, but starts fighting Killmonger over the Infinity Stones until both are trapped in a pocket dimension by Strange Supreme and the Watcher.

In Earth-838, Ultron Sentries (also voiced by Marquand) serve as guards working for the Illuminati that apprehend Stephen Strange and America Chavez when they arrive there. Many of them are later destroyed by Wanda Maximoff.

 the character has appeared in the film Avengers: Age of Ultron. The alternate versions of Ultron appeared in the Disney+ animated series What If...? and the film Doctor Strange in the Multiverse of Madness.

V

Valkyrie 

King "Val" Valkyrie (portrayed by Tessa Thompson), also known as Scrapper 142, is the last surviving of a group of Asgardian female warriors called the Valkyries. In 2017, she allies herself with Thor and Bruce Banner to fight Thor's sister Hela. She survives the Blip and brings the remaining Asgardians to a town in Norway called New Asgard, which she de facto rules in place of the depressed Thor by 2023. She later joins the Avengers in their final battle against Thanos and his army. After the battle, Thor officially leaves her in charge of New Asgard as its king, and she later assists him in facing Gorr, the God-Butcher, acquiring Zeus' Thunderbolt for herself in the process.

An alternate version of the character attends Thor's massive party.

 the character has appeared in three films: Thor: Ragnarok, Avengers: Endgame and Thor: Love and Thunder; as well as the Disney+ series Loki (archival footage). An alternate version of Valkyrie appeared in the animated series What If...?

Hope van Dyne / Wasp

Janet van Dyne / Wasp 

Janet van Dyne (portrayed by Michelle Pfeiffer) is a scientist, the wife of Hank Pym, mother of Hope van Dyne, and the MCU's original Wasp. As the Wasp, Janet operated as high-ranking agent at S.H.I.E.L.D. alongside Pym on field missions where she wore a shrinking suit with similar powers as the Ant-Man one, with the added capability of wings for flight. During a mission in 1987, Janet turned off her suit regulator and became sub-atomic, disappearing into the Quantum Realm. During this time, she meets Kang the Conqueror who had been exiled there. She helps him fix his Time Chair and restore his multiversal power core. However, she learns through a neurolink with the chair of Kang's true intentions of destruction. She betrays him and makes the core unusable, before running away and joining a refugee resistance movement. In 2018, she is rescued by Pym with Hope and Scott Lang's help. Shortly after, Janet becomes a victim of the Blip. In 2023, she is restored to life and attends Tony Stark's funeral with Pym, Hope, and Lang. In 2025, she, Pym, Hope, Lang, and Cassie Lang are accidentally transported to the Quantum Realm where they encounter and seemingly defeat Kang from escaping.

In an alternate universe, Janet is the patient zero with an infectious quantum virus that has turned her into a zombie, which is spread across the Earth after Pym rescues her from the Quantum Realm.

 the character has appeared in three films: Ant-Man and the Wasp, Avengers: Endgame, and Ant-Man and the Wasp: Quantumania. An alternate version of van Dyne appeared in the Disney+ animated series What If...?.

Anton Vanko 

Anton Vanko (portrayed by Yevgeni Lazarev) is a Soviet scientist and partner of Howard Stark who both help create the first arc reactor. He betrays Stark by selling their designs on the black market. When Stark finds out, Vanko is deported and becomes a drunk. His son Ivan Vanko vows revenge on the Stark family after his death.

 the character has appeared in the film Iron Man 2 and the television series Agent Carter as a young man, portrayed by Costa Ronin.

Ivan Vanko / Whiplash 

Ivan Vanko (portrayed by Mickey Rourke), also known as Whiplash, is the son of Anton Vanko. Learning what he knew of his father of the original model of the arc reactor, he uses it to create electric whips to kill Tony Stark. After his failure to do so, he attracts business rival Justin Hammer, for the creation of a new suit for Hammer, although Vanko later betrays him using drones to kill Stark and then attempts to kill him with a new exoskeleton suit. He is defeated in battle with the combined forces of Stark and James Rhodes and subsequently killed by his exoskeleton suit self-destructing.

 the character has appeared in the film Iron Man 2.

Volstagg 

Volstagg (portrayed by Ray Stevenson) is a member of the Warriors Three, depicted as a warrior of Asgard who loves to eat. He is killed by Hela in 2017 when she invades Asgard after being freed from her imprisonment.

 the character has appeared in four films: Thor, Thor: The Dark World, Thor: Ragnarok, and Thor: Love and Thunder (archival footage). An alternate version of Volstagg appeared in the Disney+ animated series What If...?, voiced by Fred Tatasciore.

Melina Vostokoff 

Melina Vostokoff (portrayed by Rachel Weisz) is a seasoned spy who trained in the Red Room as a Black Widow and is a mother-figure to Natasha Romanoff and Yelena Belova. She is also a scientist who does research into mind control methods for General Dreykov.

 the character has appeared in the film Black Widow.

Vision

W

John Walker / Captain America / U.S. Agent 

Captain John F. Walker (portrayed by Wyatt Russell) is the former successor to Steve Rogers as Captain America appointed by the U.S. Government. His partner was Lemar Hoskins, also known as "Battlestar", and the two served in Operation Enduring Freedom together. Walker was a football star at Custer's Grove High School in Georgia and graduated from West Point in 2009. He goes on to become a highly decorated U.S. Army Captain and the first person in history to receive the Medal of Honor three times for his combat service. He also commanded high level counter-terrorism and hostage rescue operations. He studied at MIT and tested well above average in speed, endurance, and intelligence.

He is chosen by the Global Repatriation Council (GRC) to help quash the ongoing violent post-Blip revolutions occurring across the world. He comes to the aid of Sam Wilson and Bucky Barnes during their first confrontation with the Flag Smashers and attempts to recruit them to join the GRC but they refuse. Walker later assists Barnes after he is arrested for missing court-mandated therapy and again is refused when he asks Barnes and Wilson to join him. Walker ultimately warns them to stay out of his way. During a fight with the Flag Smashers, Walker retrieves a vial of Super Soldier serum, and decides to ingest it. In the ensuing battle with the Flag Smashers, Hoskins is killed by Karli Morgenthau, leading Walker to murder a Flag Smasher by driving the shield into the man's chest while a horrified crowd watches. For this, Wilson and Barnes fight him for the shield and defeat him. The government strips Walker of his role as Captain America, and he is other than honorably discharged from the army. However, he builds a new shield from scrap metal and his Medal of Honor. Thus equipped, Walker confronts the Flag Smashers to avenge Hoskins, but defers his original goal and saves the Flag Smashers' hostages. After Wilson helps save them as Captain America, Walker assists Barnes in capturing the Flag Smashers. Afterwards, Walker is dubbed as U.S. Agent by Contessa Valentina Allegra de Fontaine.

 the character has appeared in the Disney+ series The Falcon and the Winter Soldier. He will return in the upcoming film Thunderbolts.

Jennifer Walters / She-Hulk 

Jennifer "Jen" Walters (portrayed by Tatiana Maslany) is an attorney at Goodman, Lieber, Kurtzberg & Holliway and former Deputy District Attorney for the City of Los Angeles. After coming into contact with her cousin Bruce Banner's blood, she undergoes a physical transformation similar to his and becomes known as She-Hulk. She is then hired by GLK&H to be the face of their superhuman law division, and later dates Matt Murdock.

 the character has appeared in the Disney+ series She-Hulk: Attorney at Law.

Watcher 

The Watcher (voiced by Jeffrey Wright) is a member of the extraterrestrial species of the same name who observes the multiverse and strictly refuses to interfere with its events. He maintains his vow until he is forced to act to save the multiverse from a version of Ultron, and manages to do this with the help of Guardians of the Multiverse. He is based on Uatu the Watcher from the comic books.

 the character has appeared in the Disney+ animated series What If...?

Raza al-Wazar 

Raza Hamidmi al-Wazar (portrayed by Faran Tahir) is a terrorist leader of the Ten Rings group who kidnap Tony Stark. Outside of his character sharing some characteristics from the comic book character Wong-Chu and referencing the organization that alludes to the Mandarin, Raza is an original character of the MCU. He uses Stark Industries weapons for personal gain, and is responsible for the origin of Stark as Iron Man, as he is the one who abducted him for his self-proclaimed personal gain of taking over the world, citing Genghis Khan as his influence. He is later revealed to be working for Obadiah Stane, who ultimately kills him.

 the character has appeared in the film Iron Man.

Xu Wenwu

Nicodemus West 

Dr. Nicodemus West (portrayed by Michael Stuhlbarg) is a rival surgeon to Stephen Strange.

 the character has appeared in two films: Doctor Strange and Doctor Strange in the Multiverse of Madness.

Dane Whitman 

Dane Whitman (portrayed by Kit Harington) is a human who is dating Sersi.

 the character has appeared in the film Eternals.

Riri Williams / Ironheart 

Riri Williams (portrayed by Dominique Thorne), also known as Ironheart, is an MIT student and genius inventor from Chicago who creates a suit of armor that rivals the one built by Tony Stark / Iron Man, and whose vibranium detector is stolen by the CIA, leading to her being hunted down by Talokan and Wakanda.

 the character has appeared in the film Black Panther: Wakanda Forever. She will return in the upcoming Disney+ series Ironheart.

Sam Wilson / Falcon / Captain America

Sarah Wilson 

Sarah Wilson (portrayed by Adepero Oduye) is the sister of Sam Wilson. She has two sons, AJ (portrayed by Chase River McGhee) and Cass (portrayed by Aaron Haynes), and struggles financially in Sam's absence during the Blip.

 the character has appeared in the Disney+ series The Falcon and The Winter Soldier.

W'Kabi 

W'Kabi (portrayed by Daniel Kaluuya) is the chief of Wakanda's Border Tribe as well as T'Challa's best friend and Okoye's husband. As he is responsible for the borders of Wakanda, W'Kabi and his guards have trained armored white rhinoceroses as shock cavalry. W'Kabi loses faith in T'Challa when he fails to capture Ulysses Klaue (who had killed his parents decades earlier while stealing vibranium), and supports N'Jadaka when he subsequently takes the throne. During the final battle, Okoye confronts W'Kabi when he tries to trample M'Baku with an armored white rhinoceros, saying she values Wakanda more than their love. Not wanting to die by Okoye's hands or take her life, W'Kabi surrenders and the rest of the Border Tribe does the same. It is revealed in Black Panther: Wakanda Forever that he was imprisoned following the events of the first film for aligning with Killmonger.

 the character has appeared in the film Black Panther.

Wong

Jimmy Woo 

James E. "Jimmy" Woo (portrayed by Randall Park) is an FBI agent. In 2016, Woo is assigned to be Scott Lang's parole officer while he is under house arrest for two years. In 2023, Woo is called in to investigate a missing persons case in Westview, New Jersey. He works alongside S.W.O.R.D. to investigate Wanda Maximoff's anomaly, teaming up with Monica Rambeau and Darcy Lewis. In 2025, Woo has become friends with Lang.

 the character has appeared in two films: Ant-Man and the Wasp and Ant-Man and the Wasp: Quantumania, as well as the Disney+ series WandaVision. An alternate version of the character will appear in the animated series Marvel Zombies.

X

Charles Xavier

Xu Xialing 

Xu Xialing (portrayed by Meng'er Zhang) is Shang-Chi's sister. After escaping the Ten Rings, Xialing establishes an underground fight club in Macau. Xialing is captured along with her brother and Katy by Wenwu but escapes with them to Ta Lo. She helps defend the village from the Ten Rings and later the Dweller-in-Darkness. After Wenwu's death, Xialing becomes the new leader of the Ten Rings. She is partially inspired by Zheng Bao Yu and Sister Dagger from the comic books.

, the character has appeared in the film Shang-Chi and the Legend of the Ten Rings.

Y

Ying Li 

Ying Li (portrayed by Fala Chen) is Wenwu's wife and the mother of Shang-Chi and Xialing who was a guardian of Ta Lo. Out of his love for Li, Wenwu disbanded the Ten Rings to spend time with her and their children. Her death at the hands of the Iron Gang prompts Wenwu into reactivating the Ten Rings and resuming his criminal activities. The Dweller-in-Darkness uses Li's voice to manipulate Wenwu into releasing him. Originally created for the MCU, Li was later integrated into the mainstream Marvel Universe as Jiang Li, Shang-Chi's real mother in the comics.

 the character has appeared in the film Shang-Chi and the Legend of the Ten Rings.

Ying Nan 

Ying Nan (portrayed by Michelle Yeoh) is a guardian of Ta Lo, Shang-Chi and Xialing's aunt, and Li's sister. Nan gives her nephew and niece suits of armor crafted from dragon scales and mentors Shang-Chi in the fighting style of Ta Lo. Nan leads the defense of Ta Lo against the Ten Rings and later the Dweller-in-Darkness.

 the character has appeared in the film Shang-Chi and the Legend of the Ten Rings.

Ho Yinsen 

Dr. Ho Yinsen (portrayed by Shaun Toub) is an engineer who helps save Tony Stark's life by creating an electromagnet which keeps shrapnel from his heart. He later helps Stark build an armor to escape from the terrorists who kidnaped them both. He then sacrifices his life to let Stark escape, with his last words being "don't waste your life, Stark".

 the character has appeared in two films: Iron Man and Iron Man 3 (cameo).

Yon-Rogg 

Yon-Rogg (portrayed by Jude Law) is the leader of Starforce, and leads the war against the Skrulls. While hunting down former Kree scientist Mar-Vell, he encounters Carol Danvers, who destroys an energy core that imbues her with powers. Yon-Rogg takes her back to Hala, gives Danvers a blood transfusion with his blood to save her life, and has her memories altered to think that she is a Kree named Vers. He mentors and trains her to be a soldier, but during an operation she is separated from the rest of the Starforce and lands on Earth. Yon-Rogg goes after her, only to discover that Danvers has switched sides after the Skrull Talos helped her recover her memories. Starforce captures Danvers, Talos, and a group of Skrull refugees, but Danvers manages to break free of Yon-Rogg and the Supreme Intelligence's hold over her by unlocking her full potential to drive back and defeat several members of the Starforce. Yon-Rogg requests assistance from Ronan the Accuser, but his assault on Earth is thwarted by Danvers. In their final confrontation, Danvers defeats Yon-Rogg. Afterwards, she sends him back to Hala to deliver her message to the Supreme Intelligence.

 the character has appeared in the film Captain Marvel.

Z

Helmut Zemo 

Baron Helmut Zemo (portrayed by Daniel Brühl) is a wealthy baron of the Sokovian royal family who served as colonel of an elite Sokovian commando unit and blamed the Avengers for their role in his family's deaths during their battle with Ultron, developing a hatred towards enhanced individuals in general. In 2016, after learning of a facility holding Hydra's Winter Soldier project and the footage of Bucky Barnes murdering Tony Stark's parents, Zemo frames Barnes by bombing the signing of the Sokovia Accords in Vienna to acquire the facility's location and then lure Stark and Steve Rogers so he can have them destroy each other. Achieving his goal of effectively fracturing the Avengers, Zemo attempts to commit suicide but is stopped by T'Challa and taken into custody by the authorities. Everett K. Ross supervises his incarceration where he mocks Zemo for failing in his efforts, but Zemo indicates otherwise. In 2024, he escapes with the help of Barnes and allies with him and Sam Wilson against the Flag Smashers for his own agenda. Though later recaptured by the Dora Milaje and sent to the Raft, Zemo arranges the murder of arrested members of the inner circle through his butler to minimize the chance of their Super-Soldier enhancements being reproduced.

 the character has appeared in the film Captain America: Civil War and the Disney+ series The Falcon and the Winter Soldier, where Zemo briefly wears his traditional purple mask from the comics, which he was not depicted with in Civil War.

Zeus 

Zeus (portrayed by Russell Crowe) is the king of the Olympians, based on the Greek mythological deity of the same name. Zeus heads the Council of Godheads in Omnipotence City, but is demonstrated by Thor to be a cowardly fool obsessed with orgies when he wouldn't come up with a solution to deal with Gorr the God Butcher. In anger, Zeus turns his lightning bolt on the group, breaking Korg's body before Thor slings the bolt back through Zeus's chest, seemingly killing him. Valkyrie takes the bolt to fight Gorr. Zeus is revealed to have survived in the mid-credits scene, sending his son Hercules to strike fear into the hearts of men again.

 the character has appeared in the film Thor: Love and Thunder.

Arnim Zola 

Dr. Arnim Zola (portrayed by Toby Jones) is a scientist working for Hydra and the Red Skull before getting captured and recruited into S.H.I.E.L.D. Zola masterminds Hydra's infiltration within S.H.I.E.L.D.'s infrastructure before a terminal illness in the 1970s leads to him transferring his consciousness into a computer system in Camp Lehigh. In 2014, his computer consciousness distracts Steve Rogers and Natasha Romanoff long enough for the camp to be wiped out by a missile barrage from Hydra.

In an alternate universe, Zola is captured by Captain Peggy Carter, who became a super-soldier instead of Steve Rogers. In another universe, a copy of Zola's consciousness is recovered by Natasha Romanoff to stop her universe's Ultron. It is hinted Zola has digital copies of his mind stored in other Hydra bases. Despite his initial failure to overwrite Ultron's A.I., Zola acquires the android's body in his second attempt and battles Killmonger for the Infinity Stones before the two are trapped in a pocket dimension by Stephen Strange Supreme and the Watcher.

 the character has appeared in two films: Captain America: The First Avenger and Captain America: The Winter Soldier; as well as the episode "Valediction" from the television series Agent Carter. His alternate versions appeared in the Disney+ animated series What If...?

Zuri 

Zuri (portrayed by Forest Whitaker as an adult, Denzel Whitaker as a young man) is a former member of the War Dogs and a Wakandan shaman, and the trusted loyal adviser to his King. As a young man, Zuri posed as an American named James to tail N'Jobu, T'Chaka's brother and a traitor, and witnessed his death at T'Chaka's hands in 1992. In 2016, Zuri appoints T'Chaka's son T'Challa as the new king, and oversees T'Challa's fight with M'Baku on challenge day by administering the liquid that removes the abilities the heart-shaped herb grants. When M'Baku is defeated, Zuri performs a ritual that involves the abilities' return. Zuri is the one to tell T'Challa the truth about N'Jobu. N'Jadaka later kills Zuri when he attempts to protect T'Challa, blaming him for doing nothing to protect N'Jobu.

 the character has appeared in the film Black Panther.

See also 
Characters of the Marvel Cinematic Universe: A–L
Features of the Marvel Cinematic Universe
Species of the Marvel Cinematic Universe
Teams and organizations of the Marvel Cinematic Universe

Notes

References 

 
Lists of film characters
Lists of American television series characters